Window Rock Unified School District (WRUSD) is a school district within Apache County, Arizona, United States. The district comprises seven schools within a 65-mile radius.

WRUSD serves several unincorporated areas, including Fort Defiance, Oak Springs, St. Michaels, Window Rock, and most of Sawmill.

Schools
 Window Rock Elementary School
 Sawmill Primary Learning Center
 Tse Ho Tso Primary Learning Center
 Tse Ho Tso Intermediate Learning Center
 Tse Ho Tso Middle School
 Tséhootsooí Diné Biʼóltaʼ
 The Navajo Nation operates Tséhootsooí Diné Bi'Ólta', a Navajo language immersion school for grades K–8 in Fort Defiance, Arizona. Located on the Arizona-New Mexico border in the southeastern quarter of the Navajo Reservation, the school strives to revitalize Navajo among children of the Window Rock Unified School District. Tséhootsooí Diné Bi'ólta' has thirteen Navajo language teachers who instruct only in the Navajo language, and no English, while five English language teachers instruct in the English language. Kindergarten and first grade are taught completely in the Navajo language, while English is incorporated into the program during third grade, when it is used for about 10% of instruction.
 Window Rock High School

References

External links
 WRUSD Official Web Page

School districts in Apache County, Arizona
Education on the Navajo Nation